Brightpoint Community College, formerly John Tyler Community College, is a public community college in Chester, Virginia.

History
The college, which opened in 1967, was named after  Virginia native John Tyler, the tenth president of the United States. In July 2021, the Virginia State Board of Community Colleges changed names for local institutions named after people who owned slaves or advocated racist policies such as school segregation. The board allowed the college to change its name to Brightpoint Community College. Instead of venerating John Tyler, who was a slaveholder and Confederacy supporter, the new name "celebrates the heart and energy of [the] institution". Additionally, new names will be designated for campus buildings and streets, including Bird Hall and Godwin Hall, both of which are named after Virginia politicians who supported segregation.

Academics
The college is accredited by the Commission on Colleges of the Southern Association of Colleges and Schools and offers 17 associate degree programs, eight certificate programs, and 36 career studies certificate programs. In addition, the college has transfer degree programs that transfer into bachelor's degree programs that are mostly freshman and sophomore level classes. During the 2010–2011 academic year, the college served more than 14,500 students. The institution also serves 15,000 non-credit students and more than 1,000 companies and government agencies annually through the Community College Workforce Alliance. John Tyler is the first college in the Virginia Community College System to be recognized for its sustainability efforts. In July 2010, it received a Leadership in Energy and Environmental Design (LEED) Silver Certification for its Midlothian Campus Science Building.

Locations
The Community College has two campuses - one in Chester, Virginia, and one in Midlothian, Virginia. The college's Nursing Education Center is located on the Johnston-Willis Campus of CJW Medical Center.

It serves the cities of Colonial Heights, Hopewell and Petersburg and the counties of Amelia, Charles City, Chesterfield, Dinwiddie, Prince George, Surry and Sussex.

References

External links

Virginia Community College System
Education in Richmond, Virginia
Educational institutions established in 1967
Universities and colleges accredited by the Southern Association of Colleges and Schools
Education in Chesterfield County, Virginia
1967 establishments in Virginia